The rowing events of the 1955 Mediterranean Games were held in Barcelona, Spain.

Medalists

Medal table

References
1955 Mediterranean Games report at the International Committee of Mediterranean Games (CIJM) website
List of Olympians who won medals at the Mediterranean Games at Olympedia.org

Mediterranean Games
Sports at the 1955 Mediterranean Games
1955